Sweet Falls (also called Kshaid Weitden, in the native dialect) is a waterfall in Shillong. It is often termed as the "most beautiful" yet "most dangerous" waterfall in Shillong.

The destination is accessible via road. However, tourists are prohibited to go close to the waterfall due to the poor route and treacherous nature of the fall.

The adjacent areas are filled with pine trees. Some of the plant species include eupatorium, lantana, rubus, fern, osmundastrum cinnamomeum and phegopteris.

Deaths

It is believed by the local people that this fall is haunted. If people go in odd number, they return in even number. The waterfall has also been the subject of numerous suicides and is infamous for many deaths.

 In July 2001 Mr. Jangkholen Haokip of Mata Lambulane, Churachandpur, Manipur and Ms. Boicy of Molnom, Churachandpur, Manipur died drowning.
On 17 March 2013, Karttik Mishra, a 23-year-old student from the Indian Institute of Management died at the falls when he was trekking along with 18 other boys. Sources indicated that the boy slipped and fell into the fall when he was supposedly taking photographs.
On 2 September 2013 two students from Manipur; Khual Ngaihte and Michael Ngaihte, hailing from Lamka, Churachandpur district died on the falls.

References

Waterfalls of Meghalaya
Shillong
East Khasi Hills district